Without a Paddle: Nature's Calling is a 2009 American adventure comedy film directed by Ellory Elkayem, written by Stephen Mazur, and is a sequel to the 2004 film Without a Paddle. Aside from the theme of three men on a river adventure to find something, there is little connection to the first film. None of the original actors return. It was released on DVD on January 13, 2009.

Plot
Ben and Zach are childhood friends who reunite years later to take part in an unusual quest that involves traveling into the woods in search of Ben's high school sweetheart. They are joined by their British rival Nigel, and as the stakes get higher and the squirrels turn hostile, the hapless trio attempts to navigate a raging river while realizing that sometimes nature isn't all it's cracked up to be.

Cast 
 Oliver James as Ben Reed
 Kristopher Turner as Zach Howell
 Rik Young as Nigel
 Madison Riley as Heather "Earthchild" Bessler
 Amber McDonald as Thunderstorm
 Jerry Rice as Hal Gore
 Cory Bossom as Young Ben Reed
 Robert Blanche as Massey
 Ellen Albertini Dow as Mrs. Bessler
 Todd A. Robinson as Overton

Reception
Entertainment Weekly called it "the most unnecessary sequel ever".

Ryan Keer of DVD Talk gave it half a star out of 5, and recommend viewers "Skip It".

References

External links
 
 

2009 films
2009 comedy films
2009 direct-to-video films
2000s American films
2000s English-language films
American comedy films
Direct-to-video sequel films
Films directed by Ellory Elkayem
Paramount Pictures direct-to-video films